Orleans II is the second album from the soft rock band Orleans. Orleans II was originally released in Japan and Europe in 1974. ABC Records chose not to release the album in the United States because they did not see any hits on the album, and the band was subsequently dropped from ABC Records. The label's parent company, the American Broadcasting Company, would use the band's later song "Still the One" as part of a promotional campaign.

Track listing

All songs written by John Hall & Johanna Hall except noted.

 "Let's Have A Good Time" - 5:14 
 "Dance with Me" - 3:19
 "Wake Up" - 2:46 
 "Let There Be Music" (Larry Hoppen, Johanna Hall) - 4:19
 "The Last Song" - 3:45
 "Sweet Johanna" - 5:16
 "Sunset" (Wells Kelly) - 3:51 
 "Money" (Larry Hoppen) - 2:55
 "The Breakdown" (Rufus Thomas, Mack Rice, Eddie Floyd) - 8:39

Personnel

 John Hall – guitars, lead vocals (all but 4, 7, 8), backing vocals; co-vocals  (2) , piano  (2, 3) , slide fuzz guitar  (4) , trumplex  (5) , steel guitar  (6) , drums  (7) , guitar solo  (9) 
 Larry Hoppen — guitars  (all but 8) , backing vocals, keyboards; co-vocals  (2) , bass  (2) , trumpet  (3) , lead electric guitar  (4) , lead vocals  (4, 8) , guitar solo  (6, 9) , guitar  (7) 
 Lance Hoppen — bass  (all but 2) , backing vocals; co-vocals  (2) 
 Wells Kelly – drums  (all but 7) , backing vocals, percussion; bass  (2) ; piano  (6, 7) ; lead vocals  (7) ; organ  (7)

References

1974 albums
ABC Records albums
Dunhill Records albums
Orleans (band) albums